Benueites is an extinct ammonoid cephalopod genus from the Late Cretaceous (Turonian), named by Revment, 1954, included in the family Acanthoceratidae, superfamily Acanthoceratoidea.

Distribution
Cretaceous of Brazil, Cameroon, Colombia (Loma Gorda Formation, Aipe, Huila), Trinidad and Tobago, Venezuela

References

Bibliography

Further reading
 W.J Arkell et al., Treatise on Invertebrate Paleontology Part L (Ammonoidea)

Ammonitida genera
Acanthoceratidae
Cretaceous ammonites
Ammonites of Africa
Cretaceous Africa
Ammonites of South America
Cretaceous Brazil
Cretaceous Caribbean
Cretaceous Colombia
Cretaceous Venezuela
Turonian life
Turonian genus first appearances
Turonian genus extinctions
Fossil taxa described in 1954